Adung Long is a village in northern Kachin State, Myanmar. It is located 1,499 feet above sea level, and is one of the northernmost settlements in the country.

References

Populated places in Kachin State